Party People may refer to:

People who love to party
Party People (album), a 2005 album by Maki Nomiya
"Party People" (Parliament song), a 1979 song by Parliament
"Party People" (Nelly song), a 2008 song by Nelly featuring Fergie
"Party People (Ignite the World)", a 2011 song by Erika Jayne
"Party People", a 2010 song by N.E.R.D from the album Nothing
"Party People", a 2012 song by Florida Georgia Line from the album Here's to the Good Times
"Party People", a 2012 remix of Edita Piekha's song "Nash Sosed" by DJs Gary Caos and Rico Bernasconi
Party People (TV series), a South Korean television program
Party People (play), a 2012 play by UNIVERSES Theater Ensemble
The Party People, a retail party supply chain based in Australia